"Forthenight" is the lead single from Musiq's third album Soulstar. It was released as a 12" single on October 7, 2003.

It debuted on the Billboard Hot R&B/Hip-Hop Songs chart on October 18, 2003, spent 20 weeks on the chart (its last being February 28, 2004), and peaked at #18. The music video featured Tamikko Beasty as its leading lady.

"Forthenight" entered the Billboard Hot 100 on November 8, 2003, spending 17 weeks there, peaking at #53 and falling off on February 28, 2004.

External links
 Music video

Musiq Soulchild songs
2003 singles
Songs written by Ivan Barias
Songs written by Carvin Haggins
2003 songs
Songs written by Musiq Soulchild
Song recordings produced by Carvin & Ivan